Nils Piwernetz (born 3 April 2000) is a German footballer who plays as a midfielder for TSV Aubstadt.

Career
Piwernetz made his professional debut for TSV Havelse in the 3. Liga on 25 August 2021 against Türkgücü München.

References

External links
 
 
 
 

2000 births
Living people
Footballers from Nuremberg
German footballers
Association football midfielders
1. FC Nürnberg II players
TSV Havelse players
TSV Aubstadt players
3. Liga players
Regionalliga players